The 2005-2006 Venezuelan Professional Baseball League season ( or LVBP) was won by the team Leones del Caracas.

Regular season standings

Eastern Division

Western Division

Playoffs

Championship series
Game 1: Tigres de Aragua 7, Leones del Caracas 4 (Aragua leads 1-0)
Game 2: Leones del Caracas 8, Aragua Tigers 6 (Series tied 1-1)
Game 3: Leones del Caracas 8, Aragua Tigers 4 (Caracas leads 2-1)
Game 4: Leones del Caracas 5, Aragua Tigers 3 (Caracas leads 3-1)
Game 5: Leones del Caracas 5, Aragua Tigers 1 (Caracas wins series, 4-1)

LVBP seasons